Andrey Leonidovich Rasbash (December 15, 1952, Ust-Kara, Nenets Autonomous Okrug, Arkhangelsk Oblast — July 23, 2006, Moscow) was Soviet and Russian figure TV, cameraman and film director, television presenter, and producer. He was one of the founders independent TV company VID (17.14%).

Biography
Andrey was born December 15, 1952, in the village of Ust-Kara, Arkhangelsk Oblast.

In 1977 he graduated from Moscow Aviation Institute majoring in  radio engineering.

He served two years in the missile and space forces, operating spacecraft of various purposes: by spy satellites and orbital stations. Within one and a half years — the developer of special equipment in military enterprise, engaged in computer programs  pattern recognition. Five times he offered to go to work in the KGB, but he refused.

In 1980, was demobilized and came to Television technical center  Ostankino, where alternately worked as a video engineer, editor and TV operator. In 1983-1984 he worked in the Department of videos, television programs, senior hardware engineer video and installation.

In 1987 he created a three-part documentary  Children of the XX Congress  on the generation of the sixties (in collaboration with Leonid Parfenov), then, beginning with the airing of the October program Vzglyad — assistant Director and then Director of the program. He was also the voice of TV company VID.

Andrey Rasbash, in 1989, he met with musicians from the band Agatha Christie, and took them for a clips for two songs.

Since 1992   General Director of broadcasting companies VID. Produced and directed first television project together with the  Wittle Communication (USA): international educational teleconference between Soviet and American students — live on 10,000 American schools. Leading from the American side — Tom Brokaw. The producer of the project Pole Chudes.

In November 2005 became creative Director of TV channel Zvezda.

Andrey Rasbash  died suddenly of a heart attack on the night of Sunday July 23, 2006 in Moscow.

References

External links
 Тайна смерти Андрея Разбаша

1952 births
2006 deaths
Russian film directors
Russian documentary filmmakers
Moscow Aviation Institute alumni
Soviet television presenters
Russian media executives
Russian television presenters
Russian male journalists